Leo Alexander Chambers (born 5 August 1995) is a retired English footballer who last played as a defender for Kingstonian. He has also played for Colchester United on loan and for England at under-16, under-17 and under-18 levels.

Club career
Born in Brixton, London, Chambers was a youth team player with West Ham before signing his first professional contract in August 2012 having joined the club aged seven. His first appearance in a first-team squad was on 20 October 2012 when he was an unused substitute in a Premier League game against Southampton. Chambers made his debut playing at right back for West Ham on 27 August 2013 in the 2–1 League Cup win against Cheltenham Town. He also started in the subsequent victories against Cardiff City and Burnley.

On 26 February 2016, Chambers signed on a one-month loan with Colchester United. He made his Colchester United and Football League debut on 27 February 2016 impressing in a home 0–0 draw with Shrewsbury Town.

In August 2017, Chambers signed for Isthmian Premier League club Billericay Town on a two-year deal. On 7 January 2018, Kingstonian signed Chambers on a 28 day-loan.

In May 2018, Chambers returned to Kingstonian on a permanent basis following two loan spells at the club. In March 2019, Chambers was loaned to Farnborough for a month. 

Following his time at Kingstonian, Chambers retired from football due to injuries.

International career
Chambers has played for England at under-16, under-17 and under-18 levels. He made his debut for the under-18 side on 24 October 2012 when, as captain, he was part of a side which beat Italy under-18s 2–0. On 5 September 2013 he made his first appearance for England at U19 level in the victory over Estonia.

Career statistics

References

External links

1995 births
Living people
English footballers
West Ham United F.C. players
Colchester United F.C. players
Association football defenders
Black British sportsmen
England youth international footballers
Footballers from Brixton
English Football League players
Billericay Town F.C. players
Kingstonian F.C. players
Farnborough F.C. players
Isthmian League players